The Hastings mine explosion was a fire at the Victor-American Fuel Company coal mine in Hastings, Las Animas County, Colorado, on April 27, 1917, in which 121 people died. A small monument marks the location, on County Road 44,  about 1.5 km west of the Ludlow Monument, which commemorates the those who died in a massacre during the Colorado Coalfield War. In June 1912, twelve miners were killed in an explosion at the same mine.

Cause
A coroner's jury found that Hastings mine inspector David Reese caused the explosion when, deep in the mine, he opened his oil-burning, key-lock safety lamp (which generated light by burning the oil on a wick) to attempt to re-light it. Reese's body was found with matches in his pants pocket, a violation of mine-safety laws.

References

External links 
Photograph of the Hastings mine explosion monument
Press account from Coal News
Hastings Mine Explosion monument

Coal mining disasters in Colorado
1917 mining disasters
1917 disasters in the United States
Colorado Mining Boom
Las Animas County, Colorado
Labor monuments and memorials
1917 in Colorado
April 1917 events